Cassilis is a Canadian rural community in Northumberland County New Brunswick on Route 420. It is situated in Southesk, a parish of Northumberland County.

History

Notable people

See also
List of communities in New Brunswick

References

Communities in Northumberland County, New Brunswick